Erigineni Thirupathi Naidu (1938–2017) was an Indian politician from Andhra Pradesh. Naidu was born on 20 September 1938 in the village of Mopadu, Andhra Pradesh.  After intermediate high school Naidu started working in the agricultural sector, while also being interested in sports and politics. In Pamuru, Andhra Pradesh, the Erigineni Thirupathi Naidu & Lakshmamma College bears his and his wife's names.

Political career 
Naidu was a leader of the Indian National Congress. He began his political career as president of Mopadu village Panchayat, and became a MLA in 1989. Defeated in 1994 while seeking re-election, Naidu was re-elected in 1999 and elected to the Andhra Pradesh Legislative Assembly in 2004 before retiring from politics in 2009 at the age of 71.

References

1938 births
2017 deaths
Indian National Congress politicians from Andhra Pradesh
Andhra Pradesh MLAs 1989–1994
Andhra Pradesh MLAs 1999–2004